John Foster (1770 - April 1792), styled The Honourable, was an Anglo-Irish politician.

Foster was the son of John Foster, 1st Baron Oriel and Margaretta, Viscountess Ferrard. He was educated at Eton College and Trinity College, Cambridge. Foster served as the Member of Parliament (MP) for Dunleer in the Irish House of Commons between 1790 and his early death in 1792. His brother Thomas Henry Foster succeeded him as MP.

References

1770 births
1792 deaths
Alumni of Trinity College, Cambridge
18th-century Anglo-Irish people
Eldest sons of British hereditary barons
Heirs apparent who never acceded
Irish MPs 1790–1797
People educated at Eton College
Members of the Parliament of Ireland (pre-1801) for County Louth constituencies